Abdel Messih El-Makari (or El-Manahri) (11 November 1892–14 April 1963) was a Coptic Orthodox monk and priest, and a 20th-century Coptic saint. Pope Cyril VI of Alexandria testified as to his holiness and asceticism.

Life

Abdel Messih El-Makari was born in 1892 in the village of Abou Shehata, Matai district, El-Menya governorate, Egypt. His father, Henein, and his mother, Esther, were both Christians. As a young adult, El-Makari left his home town for the Monastery of Saint Samuel the Confessor in el-Qalamun mountain. He did this several times, whereupon his father would come to the monastery to take him back home (events associated with the death of a large number of his father's cattle). His father later relented and allowed him to join Monastery of Saint Macarius in the desert of Scetes (Wadi El-Natrun), becoming a monk.

He later moved to El-Manahra village, Matai. El-Makari was known for his humility and asceticism. It is said that he had the gifts of prescience, discerning of spirits and healing the sick. He was very compassionate and gave everything he was given to the needy.

He died on Easter Sunday morning on 14 April 1963 / 6 (Parmouti 1669 A.M.)

See also
Coptic Saints
Coptic Orthodox Church
Samuel of Dabra Wagag

References

External links
Monastery of Saint Macarius the Great

1892 births
1963 deaths
Egyptian people of Coptic descent
Coptic Orthodox Christians from Egypt
Coptic Orthodox saints
Egyptian hermits
Egyptian Christian monks
20th-century Christian saints
People from Minya Governorate
20th-century Oriental Orthodox clergy